The Pacific Islands Leaders Meeting (PALM) is a forum between the government of Japan and leaders in the Pacific Islands region.

The Pacific Island Leaders Meeting was established by Japan in 1997 in order to facilitate and strengthen relations with the leaders of the nations of the Pacific Islands Forum. Since its foundation, PALM has become an important venue of dialogue between Japan and Pacific Island nations for important issues such as development aid and climate change.

PALM meetings
There have been five PALM meetings since the forum's founding - 1997, 2000, 2003, 2006 and 2009.  The first meeting took place in Tokyo in 1997, while the most recent forum met in Hokkaido, Japan in May 2009.

PALM 4
At the meeting of the fourth forum Pacific Island Leaders Meeting (PALM 4) in 2006, Japanese and Pacific leaders adopted the Okinawa Partnership.  Under the Okinawa Partnership, Japan agreed to increase its commitment to the development of Pacific Island Forum countries.

PALM 5
The 5th forum of the Pacific Island Leaders Meeting (PALM 5) took place between May 22–23, 2009, in Hokkaido. The meeting was jointly co-chaired by then Prime Minister of Japan Taro Aso and the Premier of Niue Toke Talagi, who was also the chairman of the Pacific Islands Forum at the time.

The 2009 PALM summit was divided into three main themes or objectives.
 The first theme was entitled, "Eco-friendly: creating a Pacific Environmental Community," which addressed the issues concerning the environment and climate change.
 The second theme was called "Rich: Overcoming vulnerabilities and promoting human security." This objective discussed what are known as human security issues, including health, water supply, and education in the small island states of the Pacific. The main focus of this discussion was to build the capacity of these resources.  Japan planned to discuss its efforts to alleviate the impact of the Global financial crisis of 2008–2009 on the Pacific island nations.
 The third theme was called "We are Islanders: People to People exchange." This theme's objective was to strengthen cultural exchanges of people between Japan and the Pacific Islands in a way that would benefit both sides strategically.

Fiji, which is under a military dictatorship, was invited to the 2009 PALM forum.  However, Commander Frank Bainimarama, the leader of the 2006 coup, was not invited to the meeting.

PALM 6
The sixth forum of the Pacific Island Leaders Meeting (PALM 6) will take place between May 25–26, 2012.

References

External links
Pacific Leaders call on Japan for leadership in Water and Sanitation
Yokwe: Participants for the Fifth Pacific Islands Leaders Meeting 
PIF Leaders meet on Japan's northern island of Hokkaido for PALM5 

Politics of Oceania
Japan–Oceania relations
Foreign relations of Japan
Pacific Islands Forum
Foreign relations of Australia
Foreign relations of the Cook Islands
Foreign relations of Fiji
Foreign relations of the Federated States of Micronesia
Foreign relations of Kiribati
Foreign relations of the Marshall Islands
Foreign relations of Nauru
Foreign relations of New Zealand
New Zealand–Pacific relations
Foreign relations of Niue
Foreign relations of Palau
Foreign relations of Papua New Guinea
Foreign relations of Samoa
Foreign relations of the Solomon Islands
Foreign relations of Tonga
Foreign relations of Tuvalu
Foreign relations of Vanuatu
Australia–Japan relations
Cook Islands–Japan relations
Fiji–Japan relations
Japan–Federated States of Micronesia relations
Japan–Kiribati relations
Japan–Marshall Islands relations
Japan–Nauru relations
Japan–New Zealand relations
Japan–Niue relations
Japan–Palau relations
Japan–Papua New Guinea relations
Japan–Samoa relations
Japan–Solomon Islands relations
Japan–Tonga relations
Japan–Tuvalu relations
Japan–Vanuatu relations
Intergovernmental organizations
Organizations established in 1997